"Riddle" is a song recorded by American R&B group En Vogue. It was written by Denzil Foster and Thomas McElroy, along with band members Cindy Herron, Maxine Jones, and Terry Ellis, for their fourth studio album Masterpiece Theater (2000), while production was helmed by Foster & McElroy. An angry mid-tempo song about a sneaking, cheating lover, "Riddle" is built around a clapping game motif, and interpolates the band's 1992 song "My Lovin' (You're Never Gonna Get It)." Lyrically, it has the protagonist revealing her feelings about discovering that her love interest is having an affair with someone else over the course of the week.

En Vogue performed "Riddle" on several shows, including The Rosie O'Donnell Show and The Tonight Show with Jay Leno. "Riddle" was the last single to feature Maxine Jones before she left to make more time for her family. In 2008, all four original members reunited to perform at a music award show. The group also performed it at several shows during their "20th Anniversary Tour" in 2009, with Dawn Robinson reuniting with Cindy, Terry and Maxine with Dawn performing the second half of Maxine's verse.

Critical reception
Upon its release, "Riddle" received a mixed to positive reception from music critics. In his reviews of parent album Masterpiece Theater, Michael Paoletta from Billboard declared the song a "percolating single which unfolds like a direct descendant of the trio's past hits. His colleague Chuck Taylor felt that "Riddle" was another smash track from the band, thought he noted that while it "does have the group's signature sound, it also seems dated." He compared "Riddle" with the band's 1992 single "My Lovin' (You're Never Gonna Get It)" whose instrumentation is interpolated near the end of the song.

Chart performance
Norwegian record producing and songwriting team Stargate, composed of Tor Erik Hermansen and Mikkel Storleer Eriksen, was consulted to produce a radio edit of "Riddle," which contains even more elements of "My Lovin' (You're Never Gonna Get It)". Additional remixes were provided by Tricky Stewart and Maurice Joshua. Commercially, though, the song failed to become a hit in the United States. "Riddle" was more popular overseas, reaching top 30 in the United Kingdom, while entering the top thirty in the Benelux states.

Music video
An accompanying music video was directed by Len Wiseman.

Track listings
All tracks written by Denzil Foster, Thomas McElroy, Cindy Herron, Maxine Jones, and Terry Ellis.

Notes
 denotes additional producer(s)

Personnel

Steve Counter – recording engineer
James Early  – guitar
Terry Ellis – vocalist, writer
Denzil Foster – instruments, producer, writer

Cindy Herron – vocalist, writer
Maxine Jones – vocalist, writer
Ken Kessie – mixing engineer
Thomas McElroy – instruments, producer, writer

Charts

Release history

References

2000 singles
En Vogue songs
2000 songs
Elektra Records singles
Songs written by Denzil Foster
Songs written by Thomas McElroy
Songs about infidelity
Song recordings produced by Foster & McElroy